The Times Telegram is an American daily newspaper published in Herkimer, New York. It serves southern Herkimer County and the westernmost part of adjacent Montgomery County in the Mohawk Valley region of New York State. It was formed on August 3 2015 by the merger of The Telegram, serving Herkimer, and The Times, serving Little Falls. It is owned by Gannett, who also owned the two newspapers before the merger.

The Telegram also published under the name of The Evening Telegram. The Times was also known as The Evening Times and the Little Falls Evening Times.

The Times Telegram shares an editor with the Observer-Dispatch, a sister Gannett paper that covers the overlapping Utica-Rome metropolitan area.

References

External links 
 

Daily newspapers published in New York (state)
Herkimer County, New York
Gannett publications